Yu Rui (born 17 April 1982) is a male Olympic backstroke swimmer from China. He swam for China at the:
Olympics: 2004
World Championships: 2003

References

1982 births
Living people
Chinese male backstroke swimmers
Swimmers from Guizhou
Olympic swimmers of China
Swimmers at the 2004 Summer Olympics
People from Tongren
Asian Games medalists in swimming
Swimmers at the 2002 Asian Games
Swimmers at the 2006 Asian Games
Universiade medalists in swimming
Asian Games silver medalists for China
Medalists at the 2006 Asian Games
Universiade bronze medalists for China
Medalists at the 2001 Summer Universiade
21st-century Chinese people